Trojan Records is a British record label founded in 1968. It specialises in ska, rocksteady, reggae and dub music. The label currently operates under the Sanctuary Records Group. The name Trojan comes from the Croydon-built Trojan truck that was used as Duke Reid's sound system in Jamaica. The truck had "Duke Reid - The Trojan King of Sounds" painted on the sides, and the music played by Reid became known as the Trojan Sound.

The label had almost 30 hit singles in the UK Singles Chart between 1969 and 1976.

History
Trojan Records was founded in 1968 when Lee Gopthal, who operated the Musicland record retail chain and owned Beat & Commercial Records, pooled his Jamaican music interests with those of Chris Blackwell’s Island Records. Until 1975, they were based at a warehouse in Neasden Lane, Willesden, London.

Trojan was instrumental in introducing reggae to a global audience and, by 1970, had secured a series of major UK chart hits. Successful Trojan artists from this period including Judge Dread, Tony Tribe, Lee "Scratch" Perry's Upsetters, Bob and Marcia, Desmond Dekker, Jimmy Cliff, the Harry J All Stars, The Maytals, The Melodians, Nicky Thomas and Dave and Ansel Collins.

The bulk of the company’s successes came via licences for Jamaican music supplied by producers such as Duke Reid, Harry Johnson and Leslie Kong. While the company’s focus was firmly on the sale of 7” singles, it also launched a series of popular, budget-priced compilations such as Tighten Up, Club Reggae and Reggae Chartbusters.

In 1972, Chris Blackwell decided to withdraw Island Records interests in Trojan. By this time, the company was trying to broaden the appeal of reggae by re-mastering and overdubbing string arrangements on the original recordings. While the move initially paid dividends, the costs involved began to take their toll on the company's finances. In 1975, the company was liquidated and its assets acquired by Marcel Rodd's Saga Records, which had previously largely focused on releasing budget LPs.

In 1985, record collector and accountant Colin Newman purchased Trojan Records. Over the years that ensued, the company mainly concentrated on re-releasing much of its back catalogue, issuing numerous ska, rocksteady and reggae recordings. Among their most popular releases were the Trojan Box Set series, each featuring 50 songs on a three-CD (or vinyl record) set in a "clamshell" box. In addition, Trojan licensed reggae classics for a number of TV commercial campaigns, most notably for TDK, Adidas and the 2000 UEFA European Football Championship.

The Sanctuary Records Group purchased Trojan Records in 2001 and continued to focus on the label's back catalogue. In 2002, Trojan's new owners acquired former UK rival record company, Creole Records, previously owned by Bruce White and Gary Himmelfarb's US-based RAS Records. In August 2007, Universal Music Group (UMG) had acquired 90% of Sanctuary Records after announcing in June a share offer that valued Sanctuary at $US87.68 million. In 2013, UMG sold their entire Sanctuary back catalogue including Trojan to BMG, as part of a divestment programme that was a mandatory condition set by EU regulators when UMG acquired EMI in 2012.

In 2018, the company celebrated 50 years in the business.

Influence on skinheads
Trojan skinheads, influenced by traditional 1960s skinhead culture, are named after Trojan Records, to stress the influence of black Jamaican music and the rude boy style to the skinhead subculture. This designation emphasizes differences from the punk rock-influenced Oi! skinheads of the 1980s. The logo of Skinheads Against Racial Prejudice (SHARP) is based on the Trojan Records logo, although the Corinthian helmet is reversed to face the opposite direction. It was designed by Roddy Moreno of Antifasist Oi! band The Oppressed. "I reversed the Trojan helmet because SHARP, in the plume, looked better that way."

Collectable records
Over the years; as demand for many rare records has increased, a number of Trojan releases have become collectors items. For example, a 1969 single by The Slickers entitled "Run Fattie" sold for more than £300 in 2015. Other collectable records on Trojan that have sold for £200 or more include "Night Of Love" by Ansel Collins, "Wiggle Waggle" by The Wanderers, and "Hang 'Em High" by Richard Ace.

Labels licensed to Trojan

Amalgamated
Attack
Big
Big Shot
Blue Cat
Bread
Clandisc
Down Town
Duke
Dynamic
Explosion
Gayfeet
GG
Green Door
Harry J
High Note
Horse
Hot Rod
Jackpot
Joe
Moodisc
Pressure Beat
Q
Randy's
Smash
Song Bird
Summit
Techniques
Treasure Isle
Upsetter

References

Further reading
Michael de Koningh & Laurence Cane-Honeysett: Young, Gifted And Black, The Story Of Trojan Records, 2003, Sanctuary Publishing, UK, .
 Neville Staple (2009) Original Rude Boy,  Aurum Press.

External links 
  
45cat Trojan Records discography
Discography at Discogs
  (2018)

British record labels
Record labels established in 1968
Ska record labels
Reggae record labels
 
IFPI members
British companies established in 1968